Hesionidae are a family of phyllodocid "bristle worms" (class Polychaeta). They are (like almost all polychaetes) marine organisms. Most are found on the continental shelf; Hesiocaeca methanicola is found on methane ice, where it feeds on bacterial biofilms.

A characteristic apomorphy of the Hesionidae are the cirrophores of the anterior segments, which are well-developed cup-like sheaths; the cirri of the subsequent segments insert into the parapodia directly, or with just a vestigial cirrophore.

Systematics
As phyllodocids, the Hesionidae belong to the order Aciculata, one of the three main clades of polychaetes. They appear to be part of the basal radiation of the main lineage of phyllodocids, alongside such families as the ragworms (Nereididae), the Pilargidae and Sphaerodoridae which are closely related to each other, the very ancient Syllidae, and perhaps the more advanced catworms (Nephtyidae). 

Numerous genera are still treated as Hesionidae incertae sedis, not reliably assignable to either of the three generally recognized hesionid subfamilies:

 Alikuhnia (including Anophthalmus Alikunhi, 1949 (non Schmidt, 1844: preoccupied))
 Anoplonereis Giard, 1882
 Cirrosyllis Schmarda, 1861
 Elisesione Salazar-Vallejo, 2016
 Friedericiella
 Hesiodeira Blake & Hilbig, 1990
 Hesiolyra Blake, 1985 (sometimes separated in monotypic subfamily Hesiolyrinae)
 Hesionella Hartman, 1939
 Heteropodarke Pleijel, 1999
 Leocratides Ehlers, 1908
 Mahesia Westheide, 2000
 Neopodarke Hartman, 1965
 Orseis Ehlers, 1864
 Oxydromus Grube, 1855
 Parahesione Pettibone, 1956
 Parapodarke Czerniavsky, 1882
 Periboea Ehlers, 1864
 Podarke Ehlers, 1864
 Pseudosyllidia Czerniavsky, 1882
 Sinohesione  Westheide, Purschke & Mangerich, 1994
 Sirsoe Pleijel, 1998
 Struwela Hartmann-Schröder, 1959

Footnotes

References
  (2008): Vrijenhoekia balaenophila, a new hesionid polychaete from a whale fall off California. Zool. J. Linn. Soc. 152(4): 625–634.  (HTML abstract)
  (1998): Recent views on the status, delineation, and classification of the Annelida. Am. Zool. 38(6): 953–964.  PDF fulltext
  (2008): Hesionidae. Version of 2008-MAR-26. Retrieved 2009-FEB-23.

Phyllodocida
Taxa named by Adolph Eduard Grube